Listen to Cliff! is the third studio album by singer Cliff Richard and fourth album overall. It was released through EMI Columbia Records in April 1961. The album reached No. 2 in the UK album chart, charting for 26 consecutive weeks and re-entering twice.

Recorded at Abbey Road Studios, no singles were officially released from the album. None of the 1961 single releases are available on this album. The album mainly features covers of musicals and popular 1930s and 40s songs. "Blue Moon" was issued as an export single. Tony Meehan was used as a session drummer with the Norrie Paramor orchestra.

Re-release
This album was then re-marketed on the EP format into 2 EPs:
Listen to Cliff no.1 (mono) 
Listen to Cliff no.2 (mono)

Track listing

Release formats
Vinyl LP mono & stereo
Reel to Reel Tape.(?) mono.
CD mono
CD mono/stereo

Personnel
Cliff Richard and the Shadows
Cliff Richard – lead vocals
Hank Marvin – lead guitar
Bruce Welch – rhythm guitar
Jet Harris – bass guitar
 Tony Meehan – drums

Production
Produced by Norrie Paramor
Engineered by Malcolm Addey

References 

Cliff Richard albums
The Shadows albums
1961 albums
EMI Columbia Records albums
Albums produced by Norrie Paramor